The following is the standings of the Iran Football's 2nd Division 2007–08 football season.

League standings

Group A

Group B

Second round

Championship Semi-finals 
June 1, Yadegar-e-Emam Stadium, Tabriz

June 2, Yadegar-e-Emam Stadium, Tabriz

Third place play-off 

June 5, Yadegar-e-Emam Stadium, Tabriz

Championship final 

June 5, Yadegar-e-Emam Stadium, Tabriz

References

League 2 (Iran) seasons
3